The Baloise Art Prize is a prize awarded to two people each year at "Art Statements" sector of the international Art Basel fair. 

The prize is awarded by the Bâloise group (insurance and banking), a company that works to promote contemporary, emerging art. The Prize has been in existence since 1999. Each winner receives CHF 30,000. The winners' acquired works are then donated to Hamburger Bahnhof – Museum für Gegenwart in Berlin, Germany, and the Mudam (Musée d’Art Moderne Grand-Duc Jean), Luxembourg.

Prizewinners
1999 – Laura Owens, Matthew Ritchie
2000 – Jeroen de Rijke/Willem de Rooij, Navin Rawanchaikul
2001 – Ross Sinclair, Annika Larsson
2002 – Cathy Wilkes, John Pilson
2003 – Monika Sosnowska, Saskia Olde Wolbers
2004 – Aleksandra Mir, Tino Sehgal
2005 – Jim Drain, Ryan Gander
2006 – Keren Cytter, Peter Piller
2007 – Haegue Yang, Andreas Eriksson
2008 – Duncan Campbell, Tris Vonna-Michell
2009 – Nina Canell, Geert Goiris
2010 – Claire Hooper, Simon Fujiwara
2011 – Ben Rivers, Alejandro Cesarco
2012 – Karsten Födinger, Simon Denny
2013 – Jenni Tischer, Kemang Wa Lehulere
2014 – John Skoog
2015 – Beatrice Gibson, Mathieu Kleyebe Abonnenc
2016 – Sara Cwynar, Mary Reid Kelley
2017 – Martha Atienza, Sam Pulitzer
2018 – Lawrence Abu Hamdan, Suki Seokyeong Kang
2019 – Giulia Cenci, Xinyi Cheng
2021 – Hana Miletić, Cameron Clayborn
2022 – Tourmaline, Helena Uambembe

See also

 List of European art awards

References

External links
 Baloise Art website

1999 establishments in Switzerland
Awards established in 1999

International art awards
Contemporary art awards
Lists of award winners